Bal Kudtarkar (21 August 1921 – 7 February 2020) was a radio personality from All India Radio, Mumbai. He was the Marathi voice that was most recognized on Mumbai Radio and was the voice enjoyed by millions from the 1940s through 1980s. His most famous radio creation was a show called "Prapanch" and its revived version "Punha Prapanch", a 15-minute radio show with three characters (Pant, Meena and Tekade) that covered local events and the toils of daily life, in a humorous way.  The three characters were Pant (Bal Kudtarkar), Meena (late Neelam Prabhu) and Tekade (late Prabhakar Joshi).

Kudtarker died in February 2020 at a private hospital. He is survived by two children and three grandchildren. His body was cremated on 6 February 2020.

References

1921 births
2020 deaths
Place of birth missing
All India Radio people
Indian male radio actors